Ynys Llanddwyn (also known as Llanddwyn Island) is a small tidal island off the west coast of Anglesey (Welsh: Ynys Môn), northwest Wales. The nearest settlement is the village of Newborough.

Geology and geography
The island is of geological interest with pillow lava, jasper formations and aeolian sand deposits. The island forms part of the National Nature Reserve of Newborough Warren which includes the extensive and floristically rich sand dune system.

Ynys Llanddwyn is a tidal island; it remains attached to the mainland except at high tide. It provides views of Snowdonia and the Llŷn Peninsula. Tŵr Mawr lighthouse marks the western entrance to the Menai Strait.

IUGS geological heritage site
In respect of the site having 'spectacular, accessible and well-preserved exposures of late Neoproterozoic-Cambrian mélange with more than 200 years of study', the International Union of Geological Sciences (IUGS) included the 'Ynys Llanddwyn late Neoproterozoic-Cambrian Mélange' in its assemblage of 100 'geological heritage sites' around the world in a listing published in October 2022. The organisation defines an IUGS Geological Heritage Site as 'a key place with geological elements and/or processes of international scientific relevance, used as a reference, and/or with a substantial contribution to the development of geological sciences through history.'

Saint Dwynwen 

The island is rich in legends, in particular in its association with Dwynwen. The name Llanddwyn means "The church of St. Dwynwen". Dwynwen is the Welsh patron saint of lovers, making her the Welsh equivalent of St. Valentine. Her Saint's day is 25 January and is often celebrated by the Welsh with cards and flowers. The island bears the ruined remains of St Dwynwen's Church. Unusually for churches in that region it has a cruciform floorplan.

Archaeologists examined the ruins of St Dwynwen's in 2011 and again in 2021. The 2021 dig discovered traces of even older buildings below the ruins.

Visitors and footpaths 
Newborough National Nature Reserve & Forest, of which Ynys Llanddwyn is part, received 478,204 visitors in 2018.

The island provides a worth-while goal after the mile-long walk along the beach from the nearest car park. Ynys Llanddwyn, with the neighbouring beach, has been awarded Blue Flag beach status in recognition of the cleanliness of the sea and the beaches.

Time line 
1873 – Construction of lighthouse on Ynys Llanddwyn.
1903 – Closure of the lifeboat station on Ynys Llanddwyn.
1911 – RSPB establishes its first reserve in Wales at Ynys Llanddwyn 
3 December 1920 – Five crew members from the Rhoscolyn lifeboat are lost off Llanddwyn, Anglesey.

In film 
In 2004, Ynys Llanddwyn was used as a filming location in Demi Moore's romantic thriller Half Light. Tŵr Mawr was used as a lighthouse which plays a key role in the film. CGI was used to create the effect of a real light on top of the lighthouse.
Bryn Terfel filmed his video for Cavatina (arranged by Chris Hazell)  on Ynys Llanddwyn "a very beautiful romantic place" (Bryn on BBC Breakfast)
In 2009, a scene for the Hollywood blockbuster Clash of the Titans was filmed at Llanddwyn.
 BBC Wales show ‘’The 1900 Island’’ was filmed on the island the show was broadcast nationally in 2019.

Photos

References

Hague, D., B., Lighthouses of Wales Their Architecture and Archaeology (Royal Commission on the Ancient and Historical Monuments of Wales, edited by Hughes, S., 1994)

External links

Half Light Filming Locations
Anglesey History History of Llanddwyn Island.
Llanddwyn by Janet Wood
A walk on Llanddwyn and a few photos
Bird charity born 100 years ago at Llanddwyn Island
Aerial Video of Llanddwyn Island

Islands of Anglesey
Tidal islands of Wales
Rhosyr